Ernest James Myers (born at Keswick 13 October 1844; died at Etchingham, Sussex, 25 November 1921), was a British poet, Classicist and author. He was the second son of the Rev. Frederic Myers, author of Catholic Thoughts, and Susan Harriett Myers (née Marshall). His elder brother was F W H Myers, the poet, critic and psychical researcher.

Early life 
Educated at Cheltenham and Balliol College, Oxford, (where he won the Gaisford Prize for Greek Verse in 1865), Ernest Myers became a fellow of Wadham College in 1868, teaching there for three years. In 1871, he moved to London, joining the Inner Temple and being called to the bar; however, he never practised as a barrister. Instead, he made his living as a translator and editor and also joined the committees of organisations such as the University Extension Society, the Charity Organisation Society, the Society for the Protection of Women & Children, and the Hellenic Society of which he was a founder member.

Writing 
Myers published poetry in The Puritans (1869), translated the Odes of Pindar (1874), followed in 1877 by a volume entitled Poems. A further, larger volume of his own poetry followed in 1880, The Defence of Rome and Other Poems, and he contributed an article on Aeschylus to a collection of Classical essays edited by Evelyn Abbott.

In 1882 he collaborated with Andrew Lang and Walter Leaf on books XVII-XXIV of Homer's Iliad (a companion volume to a  translation of the Odyssey).

Further volumes of poetry followed in the coming years: The Judgement of Prometheus (1886); and Gathered Poems (1904). He also wrote Lord Althorp: a biography (1890).

Family 
In London, in 1883, Myers married Nora Margaret Lodge (1858–1952) (a sister of George Edward Lodge), and they had five children. The family moved from London to Chislehurst in 1891. Their elder son - who may have been  the subject of Myers’ poem Infant Eyes - died as a soldier in France in 1918, the last year of World War I.

Myers maintained a love of physical exercise throughout his life, including swimming, riding, lawn tennis, walking, and golf. He died on 25 November 1921 at Etchingham, Sussex, aged 77.

Works
The Puritans

References

External links
 
 
 
A summary of Myers’ life, together with some of his poetry
‘’The Times’’ archive online

1844 births
1921 deaths
People educated at Cheltenham College
Alumni of Balliol College, Oxford
English classical scholars
English male poets
Translators of Homer
People from Keswick, Cumbria
People from Etchingham